A pelerine is a small cape that covers the shoulders. Historically, the pelerine possibly originated in a type of 15th century armor padding that protected the neck and shoulders by itself, if the padded fabric was reinforced internally with metal, and/or acted as padding between armor and the skin in the neck-to-shoulder region. The pelerine often had fasteners so that pauldrons could be attached. In the world of fashion, it was most popular during the mid- to late nineteenth century in Europe and the Americas.

The word comes from the French "pèlerine" (pilgrim) and is perhaps a reference to the small capes worn by many of the women in Jean-Antoine Watteau's 1717 painting Pilgrimage to Cythera. 

Pelerines could be made of various materials, including muslin and silk. They could be adorned with embroidery, beadwork, ruffles, or even featherwork. Crocheted pelerines were also common.

Layered muslin pelerines were popular in the 1830s as an option to drape over the top of the large sleeves fashionable at that period. Along with tippets, they helped emphasise the fashionable width of the sleeves and the shoulderline of the decade.

By the late nineteenth century, pelerines tended to be seen as less formal garments and were often worn at home.

Gallery

Related 

Cape
Pellegrina
Shawl
Tippet

References

Fashion terminology
Robes and cloaks
1830s fashion
19th-century fashion